Nazario Toledo  (July 28, 1807 – December 17, 1887) was a Costa Rican politician.

References

Costa Rican politicians
1807 births
1887 deaths